is a Japanese footballer currently playing as a forward for Tokushima Vortis.

Club career

Albriex Niigata (Singapore)
Tsuboi signed on loan from J2 League team Tokushima Vortis for the 2021 Singapore Premier League season and has set himself a target of reaching double figures for goals scored. He conjured a dream debut as he netted a brace and led his team to a 3-1 win over Hougang United on the opening day of the 2021 SPL season. He continued his goal scoring start to the season by netting a goal and laying off two assists for his teammates Ryoya Taniguchi and Makoto Ito, helping his team to a 3-0 win over Young Lions in match day 2 of the 2021 season, lifting the White Swans to the top of the table and the only side left with a 100% record.

Career statistics

Club
.

Notes

References

External links

2000 births
Living people
Association football people from Toyama Prefecture
Japanese footballers
Association football forwards
J3 League players
Japan Football League players
Singapore Premier League players
J2 League players
Kataller Toyama players
Tokushima Vortis players
Blaublitz Akita players
Kochi United SC players
Albirex Niigata Singapore FC players
Japanese expatriate footballers
Japanese expatriate sportspeople in Singapore
Expatriate footballers in Singapore